

1980 Final results 
No documented detailed results found yet!

1981 Final results 

 1981 Progress

1982 Final results 

 1982 Progress

1983 Final results 

Only the top 8 boats are documented.

1984 Final results 

Only the top 5 boats are documented.:

1985 Final results 

 1985 Progress

1986 Final results 

 1986 Progress

1987 Final results 

 1987 Progress

1988 Final results 

 1988 Progress

1989 Final results 

 1989 Progress

Further results
For further results see:
 Soling North American Championship results (1969–79)
 Soling North American Championship results (1980–89)
 Soling North American Championship results (1990–99)
 Soling North American Championship results (2000–09)
 Soling North American Championship results (2010–19)
 Soling North American Championship results (2020–29)

References

Soling North American Championship